The Strip is an American action drama series created by Alfred Gough and Miles Millar, which aired on UPN from October 12, 1999 to July 7, 2000, during the 1999–2000 television season. The drama series was produced by Silver Pictures Television, Millar Gough Ink and Warner Bros. Television.

Synopsis
Sean Patrick Flanery and Guy Torry portray former Las Vegas Metropolitan Police Department detectives who are hired by the owner of Caesars Palace to serve as "troubleshooters" protecting his interests.

The series was cancelled after nine episodes, with a tenth episode airing months later in July 2000.

Cast
 Sean Patrick Flanery as Elvis Ford
 Guy Torry as Jesse Weir
 Joe Viterelli as Cameron Green
 Brett Rickaby as Chad
 Keith Odett as Tad
 Stacey Dash as Vanessa Weir
 Jeff Eagle as Felix Cramer

Episodes

Production
The Strip was picked up by UPN as a series in March 1999. It was created by Alfred Gough and Miles Millar, who served as executive producers alongside Joel Silver.

The series was shot during 1999, at various locations in the Las Vegas Valley, including the real Caesars Palace resort. Other locations used throughout the series included the Stratosphere resort, Eldorado Dry Lake, and a warehouse in Henderson, Nevada that served as a soundstage facility. The series premiered on October 12, 1999, and was canceled six weeks later.

Reception
Ray Richmond of Variety wrote, "As shallow and contrived as 'The Strip' often proves to be, there is also something wonderful about a show that ain't afraid to wear its testosterone and aggression on its sleeve".

References

External links 
 
 

1990s American drama television series
2000s American drama television series
1999 American television series debuts
2000 American television series endings
American action television series
English-language television shows
Television shows set in the Las Vegas Valley
UPN original programming
Television series by Warner Bros. Television Studios
Fictional portrayals of the Las Vegas Metropolitan Police Department
Television series created by Alfred Gough
Television series created by Miles Millar